The 2006 Boston Red Sox season was the 106th season in the franchise's Major League Baseball history. The Red Sox finished third in the American League East with a record of 86 wins and 76 losses, 11 games behind the New York Yankees. The Red Sox were eliminated from playoff contention for the first time since 2002.

Offseason
November 24, 2005: Shortstop Hanley Ramírez was traded by the Boston Red Sox along with pitchers Jesús Delgado (minors), Harvey García and Aníbal Sánchez to the Florida Marlins, in exchange for P Josh Beckett, 3B Mike Lowell and P Guillermo Mota.
December 8, 2005: Édgar Rentería was traded by the Boston Red Sox with cash to the Atlanta Braves for Andy Marte.
February 1, 2006: Free agent catcher Ken Huckaby was signed by Boston.

Regular season

Transactions
 January 27, 2006: The Red Sox sent Guillermo Mota, Andy Marte, Kelly Shoppach, a player to be named later (Randy Newson, July 21) and cash to the Indians, in exchange for Coco Crisp, David Riske, and Josh Bard.
 March 30, 2006: Charles Johnson and Chris Narveson were obtained by Boston from the Rockies for Byung-hyun Kim and cash consideration. Johnson was released the same day.
 May 1, 2006: Doug Mirabelli was acquired by the Red Sox from the Padres in exchange for Josh Bard, Cla Meredith and cash.
 June 21, 2006: Jason Johnson was purchased by the Red Sox from the Indians.
 August 4: Javy López was purchased by Boston from the Orioles.
 August 16, 2006: Carlos Peña signed as a free agent with the Red Sox.
August 17, 2006: Eric Hinske was purchased by the Red Sox from the Blue Jays.
August 28, 2006: Jason Johnson was released by the Red Sox.
September 8, 2006: Javy López was released by the Red Sox.

Season summary
The Boston Red Sox finished eleven games behind the first place team in the American League East, the New York Yankees. While part of the blame for the Red Sox's demise could be the five-game sweep at the hands of the New York Yankees from August 18 – 21, the team had a poor record the entire month of August (going just 9-21) and September (13-14).  Also, they suffered extensive injuries to Jason Varitek, Manny Ramirez, Jonathan Papelbon, Jon Lester, and Keith Foulke.

Season standings

Record vs. opponents

Opening Day lineup

Roster

Game log

|- style="text-align:center;background-color:#bbffbb"
| 1 || April 3 || @ Rangers || 7–3 || Schilling (1–0) || Millwood (0–1) || || 51,541 || 1–0
|- style="text-align:center;background-color:#ffbbbb"
| 2 || April 4 || @ Rangers || 10–4 || Padilla (1–0) || Wakefield (0–1) || || 29,442 || 1–1
|- style="text-align:center;background-color:#bbffbb"
| 3 || April 5 || @ Rangers || 2–1 || Beckett (1–0) || Loe (0–1) || Papelbon (1) || 32,416 || 2–1
|- style="text-align:center;background-color:#bbffbb"
| 4 || April 7 || @ Orioles || 14–8 || Clement (1–0) || Cabrera (0–1) || || 37,063 || 3–1
|- style="text-align:center;background-color:#bbffbb"
| 5 || April 8 || @ Orioles || 2–1 || Schilling (2–0) || Chen (0–1) || Papelbon (2) || 41,166 || 4–1
|- style="text-align:center;background-color:#bbffbb"
| 6 || April 9 || @ Orioles || 4–1 || Wakefield (1–1) || López (1–1) || Papelbon (3) || 37,998 || 5–1
|- style="text-align:center;background-color:#bbffbb"
| 7 || April 11 || Blue Jays || 6–1 || Beckett (2–0) || Towers (0–2) || Papelbon (4) || 35,491 || 6–1
|- style="text-align:center;background-color:#ffbbbb"
| 8 || April 12 || Blue Jays || 8–4 || Chacín (2–0) || Wells (0–1) || || 36,378 || 6–2
|- style="text-align:center;background-color:#ffbbbb"
| 9 || April 13 || Blue Jays || 8–6 || Lilly (1–0) || Clement (1–1) || Ryan (3) || 36,524 || 6–3
|- style="text-align:center;background-color:#bbffbb"
| 10 || April 14 || Mariners || 2–1 || Schilling (3–0) || Moyer (0–2) || Papelbon (5) || 36,431 || 7–3
|- style="text-align:center;background-color:#ffbbbb"
| 11 || April 15 || Mariners || 3–0 || Piñeiro (2–1) || Wakefield (1–2) || Guardado (2) || 36,047 || 7–4
|- style="text-align:center;background-color:#bbffbb"
| 12 || April 16 || Mariners || 3–2 || Beckett (3–0) || Washburn (1–2) || Papelbon (6) || 36,181 || 8–4
|- style="text-align:center;background-color:#bbffbb"
| 13 || April 17 || Mariners || 7–6 || Timlin (1–0) || Guardado (0–1) || || 36,188 || 9–4
|- style="text-align:center;background-color:#bbffbb"
| 14 || April 18 || Devil Rays || 7–4 || Timlin (2–0) || Lugo (0–1) || Papelbon (7) || 36,423 || 10–4
|- style="text-align:center;background-color:#bbffbb"
| 15 || April 19 || Devil Rays || 9–1 || Schilling (4–0) || Waechter (0–1) || || 36,454 || 11–4
|- style="text-align:center;background-color:#ffbbbb"
| 16 || April 20 || Devil Rays || 5–1 || Kazmir (2–1) || Wakefield (1–3) || Miceli (4) || 36,607 || 11–5
|- style="text-align:center;background-color:#ffbbbb"
| 17 || April 21 || @ Blue Jays || 7–6 || Speier (1–0) || Foulke (0–1) || || 28,333 || 11–6
|- style="text-align:center;background-color:#ffbbbb"
| 18 || April 22 || @ Blue Jays || 8–1 || Halladay (2–1) || DiNardo (0–1) || Walker (1) || 34,387 || 11–7
|- style="text-align:center;background-color:#bbffbb"
| 19 || April 23 || @ Blue Jays || 6–3 || Clement (2–1) || Towers (0–4) || Papelbon (8) || 28,737 || 12–7
|- style="text-align:center;background-color:#bbffbb"
| 20 || April 25 || @ Indians || 8–6 || Foulke (1–1) || Mota (0–1) || Papelbon (9) || 18,438 || 13–7
|- style="text-align:center;background-color:#ffbbbb"
| 21 || April 26 || @ Indians || 7–1 || Lee (2–1) || Wakefield (1–4) || || 21,575 || 13–8
|- style="text-align:center;background-color:#ffbbbb"
| 22 || April 27 || @ Indians || 15–3 || Byrd (3–2) || Beckett (3–1) || || 26,952 || 13–9
|- style="text-align:center;background-color:#ffbbbb"
| 23 || April 28 || @ Devil Rays || 5–2 || Fossum (1–1) || Clement (2–2) || Walker (1) || 22,565 || 13–10
|- style="text-align:center;background-color:#bbffbb"
| 24 || April 29 || @ Devil Rays || 9–6 || Foulke (2–1) || Walker (0–1) || Papelbon (10) || 27,415 || 14–10
|- style="text-align:center;background-color:#ffbbbb"
| 25 || April 30 || @ Devil Rays || 5–4 || Kazmir (3–2) || Schilling (4–1) || Camp (3) || 26,690 || 14–11

|- style="text-align:center;background-color:#BBFFBB"
| 26 || May 1 || Yankees || 7–3 || Timlin (3–0) || Small (0–1) || || 36,339 || 15–11
|- style="text-align:center;background-color:#BBBBBB"
| – || May 2 || Yankees || colspan=5|Postponed (rain) || 15–11
|- style="text-align:center;background-color:#FFBBBB"
| 27 || May 3 || Blue Jays || 7–6 || McGowan (1–0) || Papelbon (0–1) || Ryan (6) || 35,881 || 15–12
|- style="text-align:center;background-color:#BBFFBB"
| 28 || May 4 || Blue Jays || 7–4 || Clement (3–2) || Towers (0–6) || Papelbon (11) || 36,396 || 16–12
|- style="text-align:center;background-color:#BBFFBB"
| 29 || May 5 || Orioles || 6–3 || Schilling (5–1) || López (1–4) || Papelbon (12) || 36,515 || 17–12
|- style="text-align:center;background-color:#BBFFBB"
| 30 || May 6 || Orioles || 9–3 || Wakefield (2–4) || Bédard (4–2) || || 36,507 || 18–12
|- style="text-align:center;background-color:#BBFFBB"
| 31 || May 7 || Orioles || 10–3 || DiNardo (1–1) || Benson (4–3) || || 36,022 || 19–12
|- style="text-align:center;background-color:#BBFFBB"
| 32 || May 9 || @Yankees || 14–3 || Beckett (4–1) || Johnson (5–3) || || 54,688 || 20–12
|- style="text-align:center;background-color:#FFBBBB"
| 33 || May 10 || @ Yankees || 7–3 || Mussina (6–1) || Schilling (5–2) || || 54,769 || 20–13
|- style="text-align:center;background-color:#BBFFBB"
| 34 || May 11 || @ Yankees || 5–3 || Wakefield (3–4) || Villone (0–1) || Papelbon (13) || 54,956 || 21–13
|- style="text-align:center;background-color:#FFBBBB"
| 35 || May 12 || Rangers || 6–0 || Loe (2–3) || Clement (3–3) || || 36,102 || 21–14
|- style="text-align:center;background-color:#BBBBBB"
| – || May 13 || Rangers || colspan=5|Postponed (rain) || 21–14
|- style="text-align:center;background-color:#BBBBBB"
| – || May 14 || Rangers || colspan=5|Postponed (rain) || 21–14
|- style="text-align:center;background-color:#BBFFBB"
| 36 || May 15 || @ Orioles || 11–1 || Beckett (5–1) || López (1–6) || || 25,607 || 22–14
|- style="text-align:center;background-color:#BBFFBB"
| 37 || May 16 || @ Orioles || 6–5 || Schilling (6–2) || Williams (1–1) || Papelbon (14) || 27,565 || 23–14
|- style="text-align:center;background-color:#FFBBBB"
| 38 || May 17 || @ Orioles || 4–3 || Bédard (5–2) || Wakefield (3–5) || Ray (10) || 32,089 || 23–15
|- style="text-align:center;background-color:#BBFFBB"
| 39 || May 19 || @ Phillies || 5–3 || Clement (4–3) || Lieber (3–5) || Papelbon (15) || 44,296 || 24–15
|- style="text-align:center;background-color:#BBFFBB"
| 40 || May 20 || @ Phillies || 8–4 || Beckett (6–1) || Myers (2–2) || || 44,809 || 25–15
|- style="text-align:center;background-color:#FFBBBB"
| 41 || May 21 || @ Phillies || 10–5 || Lidle (4–4) || DiNardo (1–2) || || 44,738 || 25–16
|- style="text-align:center;background-color:#BBFFBB"
| 42 || May 22 || Yankees || 9–5 || Schilling (7–2) || Wang (4–2) || || 36,342 || 26–16
|- style="text-align:center;background-color:#FFBBBB"
| 43 || May 23 || Yankees || 7–5 || Wright (2–3) || Wakefield (3–6) || Rivera (9) || 36,290 || 26–17
|- style="text-align:center;background-color:#FFBBBB"
| 44 || May 24 || Yankees || 8–6 || Johnson (6–4) || Clement (4–4) || Rivera (10) || 36,375 || 26–18
|- style="text-align:center;background-color:#BBFFBB"
| 45 || May 25 || Devil Rays || 4–1 || Beckett (7–1) || Waechter (0–3) || Papelbon (16) || 36209 || 27–18
|- style="text-align:center;background-color:#BBFFBB"
| 46 || May 26 || Devil Rays || 8–4 || Tavárez (1–0) || Kazmir (7–3) || Papelbon (17) || 36,129 || 28–18
|- style="text-align:center;background-color:#BBFFBB"
| 47 || May 27 || Devil Rays || 6–4 || Schilling (8–2) || McClung (2–6) || Papelbon (18) || 36,409 || 29–18
|- style="text-align:center;background-color:#BBFFBB"
| 48 || May 28 || Devil Rays || 5–4 || Wakefield (4–6) || Hendrickson (3–5) || Tavárez (1) || 36,015 || 30–18
|- style="text-align:center;background-color:#FFBBBB"
| 49 || May 29 || @ Blue Jays || 7–6 || Ryan (1–0) || Riske (0–1) || || 24,038 || 30–19
|- style="text-align:center;background-color:#FFBBBB"
| 50 || May 30 || @ Blue Jays || 8–5 || Chacín (6–1) || Beckett (7–2) || Ryan (12) || 27,324 || 30–20
|- style="text-align:center;background-color:#BBFFBB"
| 51 || May 31 || @ Blue Jays || 8–6 || Van Buren (1–0) || Lilly (5–5) || Papelbon (19) || 24,526 || 31–20

|- style="text-align:center;background-color:#BBFFBB"
| 52 || June 2 || @ Tigers || 3–2 || Seánez (1–0) || Jones (0–3) || Papelbon (20) || 35,531 || 32–20
|- style="text-align:center;background-color:#FFBBBB"
| 53 || June 3 || @ Tigers || 6–2 || Bonderman (6–4) || Wakefield (4–7) || Rodney (7) || 40,872 || 32–21
|- style="text-align:center;background-color:#BBFFBB"
| 54 || June 4 || @ Tigers || 8–3 || Clement (5–4) || Miner (0–1) || || 35,764 || 33–21
|- style="text-align:center;background-color:#FFBBBB"
| 55 || June 5 || @ Yankees || 13–5 || Mussina (8–1) || Beckett (7–3) || || 55,246 || 33–22
|- style="text-align:center;background-color:#FFBBBB"
| 56 || June 6 || @ Yankees || 2–1 || Wang (6–2) || Pauley (0–1) || Rivera (12) || 55,141 || 33–23
|- style="text-align:center;background-color:#BBBBBB"
| – || June 7 || @ Yankees || colspan=5|Postponed (rain)   || 33–23
|- style="text-align:center;background-color:#BBFFBB"
| 57 || June 8 || @ Yankees || 9–3 || Schilling (9–2) || Wright (3–4) || || 55,225 || 34–23
|- style="text-align:center;background-color:#BBFFBB"
| 58 || June 9 || Rangers || 4–3 || Papelbon (1–1) || Cordero (5–4) || || 36,133 || 35–23
|- style="text-align:center;background-color:#FFBBBB"
| 59 || June 10 || Rangers || 7–4 || Corey (1–0) || Tavárez (1–1) || Otsuka (11) || 36,920 || 35–24
|- style="text-align:center;background-color:#BBBBBB"
| – || June 10 || Rangers || colspan=5|Postponed (rain)   || 35–24
|- style="text-align:center;background-color:#BBFFBB"
| 60 || June 11 || Rangers || 5–4 || Delcarmen (1–0) || Otsuka  (2–2) || || 36,232 || 36–24
|- style="text-align:center;background-color:#FFBBBB"
| 61 || June 11 || Rangers || 13–6 || Wasdin (1–0) || Pauley (0–2) || || 35,602 || 36–25
|- style="text-align:center;background-color:#FFBBBB"
| 62 || June 13 || @ Twins || 5–2 || Reyes (1–0) || Tavárez (1–2) || || 23,531 || 36–26
|- style="text-align:center;background-color:#FFBBBB"
| 63 || June 14 || @ Twins || 8–1 || Radke (5–7) || Clement (5–5) || || 26,492 || 36–27
|- style="text-align:center;background-color:#FFBBBB"
| 64 || June 15 || @ Twins || 5–3 || Silva (3–8) || Wakefield (4–8) || Nathan (8) || 21,191 || 36–28
|- style="text-align:center;background-color:#BBFFBB"
| 65 || June 16 || @ Braves || 4–1 || Lester (1–0) || Hudson (6–5) || Papelbon (21) || 51,038 || 37–28
|- style="text-align:center;background-color:#BBFFBB"
| 66 || June 17 || @ Braves || 5–3 || Beckett (8–3) || Cormier (2–2) || Papelbon (22) || 49,364 || 38–28
|- style="text-align:center;background-color:#BBFFBB"
| 67 || June 18 || @ Braves || 10–7 || Seánez (2–0) || McBride (1–1) || Papelbon (23) || 48,826 || 39–28
|- style="text-align:center;background-color:#BBFFBB"
| 68 || June 19 || Nationals || 6–3 || Snyder (1–0) || Armas (6–4) || Timlin (1) || 36,252 || 40–28
|- style="text-align:center;background-color:#BBFFBB"
| 69 || June 20 || Nationals || 11–3 || Wakefield (5–8) || Hernández (5–8) || || 36,421 || 41–28
|- style="text-align:center;background-color:#BBFFBB"
| 70 || June 21 || Nationals || 9–3 || Lester (2–0) || Hill (1–2) || || 36,464 || 42–28
|- style="text-align:center;background-color:#BBFFBB"
| 71 || June 23 || Phillies || 10–2 || Beckett (9–3) || Madson (7–5) || || 35,948 || 43–28
|- style="text-align:center;background-color:#BBFFBB"
| 72 || June 24 || Phillies || 5–3 || Papelbon (2–1) || Gordon (2–3) || || 35,564 || 44–28
|- style="text-align:center;background-color:#BBBBBB"
| – || June 25 || Phillies || colspan=5|Postponed (rain)   || 44–28
|- style="text-align:center;background-color:#BBFFBB"
| 73 || June 26 || Phillies || 8–7 || Hansen (1–0) || Condrey (1–2) || || 36,459 || 45–28
|- style="text-align:center;background-color:#BBFFBB"
| 74 || June 27 || Mets || 9–4 || Lester (3–0) || Soler (2–2) || || 36,250 || 46–28
|- style="text-align:center;background-color:#BBFFBB"
| 75 || June 28 || Mets || 10–2 || Beckett (10–3) || Martínez (7–4) || || 36,035 || 47–28
|- style="text-align:center;background-color:#BBFFBB"
| 76 || June 29 || Mets || 4–2 || Schilling (10–2) || Heilman (0–3) || Papelbon (24) || 36,028 || 48–28
|- style="text-align:center;background-color:#FFBBBB"
| 77 || June 30 || @ Marlins || 5–2 || Willis (5–7) || Johnson (3–9) || Borowski (15) || 32,194 || 48–29

|- style="text-align:center;background-color:#BBFFBB"
| 78 || July 1 || @ Marlins || 11–5 || Wakefield (6–8) || Moehler (5–7) || || 38,014 || 49–29
|- style="text-align:center;background-color:#BBFFBB"
| 79 || July 2 || @ Marlins || 4–3 || Timlin (4–0) || Messenger (1–4) || Papelbon (25) || 22,840 || 50–29
|- style="text-align:center;background-color:#FFBBBB"
| 80 || July 3 || @ Devil Rays || 3–0 || Kazmir (10–5) || Beckett (10–4) || || 26,149 || 50–30
|- style="text-align:center;background-color:#FFBBBB"
| 81 || July 4 || @ Devil Rays || 9–6 || Switzer (1–0) || Schilling (10–3) || Camp (4) || 21,186 || 50–31
|- style="text-align:center;background-color:#FFBBBB"
| 82 || July 5 || @ Devil Rays || 5–2 || Corcoran (3–0) || Johnson (3–10) || Meadows (4) || 15,001 || 50–32
|- style="text-align:center;background-color:#BBFFBB"
| 83 || July 6 || @ Devil Rays || 12–5 || Wakefield (7–8) || Shields (4–2) || || 19,330 || 51–32
|- style="text-align:center;background-color:#BBFFBB"
| 84 || July 7 || @ White Sox || 7–2 || Lester (4–0) || Buehrle (9–6) || || 39,355 || 52–32
|- style="text-align:center;background-color:#BBFFBB"
| 85 || July 8 || @ White Sox || 9–6 || Beckett (11–4) || Riske (0–2) || Papelbon (26) || 39,497 || 53–32
|- style="text-align:center;background-color:#FFBBBB"
| 86 || July 9 || @ White Sox || 6–5 || Politte (2–2) || Seánez (2–1) || || 39,335 || 53–33
|- style="text-align:center;background-color:#FFBBBB"
| 87 || July 13 || Athletics || 5–4 || Street (3–3) || Tavárez (1–3) || Saarloos (2) || 36,141 || 53–34
|- style="text-align:center;background-color:#FFBBBB"
| 88 || July 14 || Athletics || 15–3 || Zito (9–6) || Beckett (11–5) || || 36,319 || 53–35
|- style="text-align:center;background-color:#BBFFBB"
| 89 || July 15 || Athletics || 7–0 || Schilling (11–3) || Haren (6–8) || || 36,232 || 54–35
|- style="text-align:center;background-color:#FFBBBB"
| 90 || July 16 || Athletics || 8–1 || Blanton (9–8) || Snyder (1–1) || || 35,643 || 54–36
|- style="text-align:center;background-color:#BBFFBB"
| 91 || July 17 || Royals || 5–4 || Timlin (5–0) || Peralta (1–2) || Papelbon (27) || 36,436 || 55–36
|- style="text-align:center;background-color:#BBFFBB"
| 92 || July 18 || Royals || 1–0 || Lester (5–0) || Duckworth (1–3) || Papelbon (28) || 36,224 || 56–36
|- style="text-align:center;background-color:#BBFFBB"
| 93 || July 19 || Royals || 1–0 || Beckett (12–5) || Redman (6–5) || Papelbon (29) || 36,098 || 57–36
|- style="text-align:center;background-color:#BBFFBB"
| 94 || July 20 || Rangers || 6–4 || Schilling (12–3) || Corey (1–1) || Timlin (2) || 36,489 || 58–36
|- style="text-align:center;background-color:#BBFFBB"
| 95 || July 21 || @ Mariners || 9–4 || Snyder (2–1) || Moyer (5–9) || || 46,325 || 59–36
|- style="text-align:center;background-color:#FFBBBB"
| 96 || July 22 || @ Mariners || 5–2 || Hernández (9–8) || Gabbard (0–1) || Putz (19) || 46,118 || 59–37
|- style="text-align:center;background-color:#FFBBBB"
| 97 || July 23 || @ Mariners || 9–8 || Putz (2–0) || Timlin (5–1) || || 45,975 || 59–38
|- style="text-align:center;background-color:#BBFFBB"
| 98 || July 24 || @ Athletics || 7–3 || Beckett (13–5) || Zito (10–7) || || 33,370 || 60–38
|- style="text-align:center;background-color:#BBFFBB"
| 99 || July 25 || @ Athletics || 13–5 || Schilling (13–3) || Windsor (0–1) || || 34,077 || 61–38
|- style="text-align:center;background-color:#FFBBBB"
| 100 || July 26 || @ Athletics || 5–1 || Haren (7–9) || Snyder (2–2) || || 35,077 || 61–39
|- style="text-align:center;background-color:#FFBBBB"
| 101 || July 28 || Angels || 8–3 || Escobar (7–9) || Lester (5–1) || || 36,109 || 61–40
|- style="text-align:center;background-color:#BBFFBB"
| 102 || July 29 || Angels || 7–6 || Tavárez (2–3) || Carrasco (2–3) || || 35,621 || 62–40
|- style="text-align:center;background-color:#FFBBBB"
| 103 || July 30 || Angels || 10–4 || Lackey (10–6) || Schilling (13–4) || || 36,048 || 62–41
|- style="text-align:center;background-color:#BBFFBB"
| 104 || July 31 || Indians || 9–8 || Snyder (3–2) || Carmona (1–5) || || 36,387 || 63–41

|- style="text-align:center;background-color:#FFBBBB"
| 105 || August 1 || Indians || 6–3 || Sabathia (8–7) || Johnson (3–11) || || 36,328 || 63–42
|- style="text-align:center;background-color:#BBFFBB"
| 106 || August 2 || Indians || 6–5 || Papelbon (3–1) || Carmona (1–6) || || 36,022 || 64–42
|- style="text-align:center;background-color:#FFBBBB"
| 107 || August 3 || Indians || 7–6 || Westbrook (8–7) || Beckett (13–6) || Davis (1) || 36,557 || 64–43
|- style="text-align:center;background-color:#BBFFBB"
| 108 || August 4 || @ Devil Rays || 3–2 || Schilling (14–4) || McClung (3–11) || Papelbon (30) || 27,871 || 65–43
|- style="text-align:center;background-color:#FFBBBB"
| 109 || August 5 || @ Devil Rays || 8–5 || Fossum (6–4) || Wells (0–2) || Meadows (8) || 30,603 || 65–44
|- style="text-align:center;background-color:#FFBBBB"
| 110 || August 6 || @ Devil Rays || 7–6 || Camp (4–0) || Tavárez (2–4) || || 30,093 || 65–45
|- style="text-align:center;background-color:#FFBBBB"
| 111 || August 8 || @ Royals || 6–4 || Hudson (5–3) || Lester (5–2) || Burgos (17) || 26,687 || 65–46
|- style="text-align:center;background-color:#FFBBBB"
| 112 || August 9 || @ Royals || 5–4 || Dohmann (1–1) || Papelbon (3–2) || || 21,928 || 65–47
|- style="text-align:center;background-color:#FFBBBB"
| 113 || August 10 || @ Royals || 5–4 || Sisco (1–2) || Schilling (14–5) || Burgos (18) || 21,214 || 65–48
|- style="text-align:center;background-color:#BBFFBB"
| 114 || August 11 || Orioles || 9–2 || Wells (1–2) || Loewen (2–4) || || 36,191 || 66–48
|- style="text-align:center;background-color:#BBFFBB"
| 115 || August 12 || Orioles || 8–7 || Papelbon (4–2) || Chen (0–7) || || 35,768 || 67–48
|- style="text-align:center;background-color:#BBFFBB"
| 116 || August 13 || Orioles || 11–9 || Lester (6–2) || Cabrera (5–8) || Papelbon (31) || 35,744 || 68–48
|- style="text-align:center;background-color:#FFBBBB"
| 117 || August 14 || Tigers || 7–4 || Robertson (11–8) || Beckett (13–7) || Jones (32) || 36,392 || 68–49
|- style="text-align:center;background-color:#FFBBBB"
| 118 || August 15 || Tigers || 3–2 || Rodney (6–3) || Timlin (5–2) || Jones (33) || 36,179 || 68–50
|- style="text-align:center;background-color:#BBFFBB"
| 119 || August 16 || Tigers || 6–4 || Wells (2–2) || Verlander (14–6) || Papelbon (32) || 36,304 || 69–50
|- style="text-align:center;background-color:#FFBBBB"
| 120 || August 18 || Yankees || 12–4 || Wang (14–5) || Johnson (3–12) || || 36,325 || 69–51
|- style="text-align:center;background-color:#FFBBBB"
| 121 || August 18 || Yankees || 14–11 || Myers (1–0) || Timlin (5–3) || || 36,071 || 69–52
|- style="text-align:center;background-color:#FFBBBB"
| 122 || August 19 || Yankees || 13–5 || Johnson (14–9) || Beckett (13–8) || || 35,738 || 69–53
|- style="text-align:center;background-color:#FFBBBB"
| 123 || August 20 || Yankees || 8–5 (10) || Rivera (5–5) || Hansen (1–1) || || 36,155 || 69–54
|- style="text-align:center;background-color:#FFBBBB"
| 124 || August 21 || Yankees || 2–1 || Lidle (2–2) || Wells (2–3) || Farnsworth (2) || 35,829 || 69–55
|- style="text-align:center;background-color:#FFBBBB"
| 125 || August 22 || @ Angels || 4–3 || Shields (7–7) || Gabbard (0–2) || Rodríguez (35) || 44,041 || 69–56
|- style="text-align:center;background-color:#BBFFBB"
| 126 || August 23 || @ Angels || 5–4 || Lester (7–2) || Escobar (9–11) || Papelbon (33) || 44,093 || 70–56
|- style="text-align:center;background-color:#BBFFBB"
| 127 || August 24 || @ Angels || 2–1 || Beckett (14–8) || Weaver (9–1) || Papelbon (34) || 44,109 || 71–56
|- style="text-align:center;background-color:#FFBBBB"
| 128 || August 25 || @ Mariners || 6–0 || Woods (4–1) || Schilling (14–6) || || 40,817 || 71–57
|- style="text-align:center;background-color:#FFBBBB"
| 129 || August 26 || @ Mariners || 4–3 || Putz (3–1) || Timlin (5–4) || || 44,779 || 71–58
|- style="text-align:center;background-color:#FFBBBB"
| 130 || August 27 || @ Mariners || 6–3 || Baek (1–0) || Snyder (3–3) || Putz (27) || 44,288 || 71–59
|- style="text-align:center;background-color:#FFBBBB"
| 131 || August 28 || @ Athletics || 9–0 || Loaiza (8–7) || Gabbard (0–3) || || 30,159 || 71–60
|- style="text-align:center;background-color:#FFBBBB"
| 132 || August 29 || @ Athletics || 2–1 || Saarloos (7–6) || Beckett (14–9) || Duchscherer (6) || 30,517 || 71–61
|- style="text-align:center;background-color:#FFBBBB"
| 133 || August 30 || @ Athletics || 7–2 || Zito (15–8) || Schilling (14–7) || || 31,073 || 71–62
|- style="text-align:center;background-color:#BBFFBB"
| 134 || August 31 || Blue Jays || 6–4 || Delcarmen (2–0) || Halladay (16–5) || Papelbon (35) || 36,238 || 72–62

|- style="text-align:center;background-color:#BBFFBB"
| 135 || September 1 || Blue Jays || 2–1 || Snyder (4–3) || Lilly (11–12) || Timlin (3) || 36,235 || 73–62
|- style="text-align:center;background-color:#FFBBBB"
| 136 || September 2 || Blue Jays || 5–1 || Burnett (7–6) || Jarvis (0–1) || || 35,973 || 73–63
|- style="text-align:center;background-color:#FFBBBB"
| 137 || September 3 || Blue Jays || 6–1 || Chacín (7–3) || Beckett (14–10) || || 35,719 || 73–64
|- style="text-align:center;background-color:#BBFFBB"
| 138 || September 4 || White Sox || 3–2 || Timlin (6–4) || McCarthy (3–6) || || 36,206 || 74–64
|- style="text-align:center;background-color:#BBFFBB"
| 139 || September 5 || White Sox || 1–0 || Gabbard (1–3) || Vázquez (11–9) || Timlin (4) || 35,912 || 75–64
|- style="text-align:center;background-color:#FFBBBB"
| 140 || September 6 || White Sox || 8–1 || Contreras (12–7) || Snyder (4–4) || || 35,923 || 75–65
|- style="text-align:center;background-color:#FFBBBB"
| 141 || September 8 || Royals || 10–9 || Burgos (4–5) || Timlin (6–5) || Nelson (6) || 36,531 || 75–66
|- style="text-align:center;background-color:#FFBBBB"
| 142 || September 9 || Royals || 10–4 || Nelson (1–1) || Breslow (0–1) || || 36,402 || 75–67
|- style="text-align:center;background-color:#BBFFBB"
| 143 || September 10 || Royals || 9–3 || Tavárez (3–4) || Redman (9–9) || || 35,703 || 76–67
|- style="text-align:center;background-color:#BBFFBB"
| 144 || September 12 || @ Orioles || 6–5 || Hansen (2–1) || Cabrera (7–10) || López (1) || 24,551 || 77–67
|- style="text-align:center;background-color:#FFBBBB"
| 145 || September 13 || @ Orioles || 4–0 || Bédard (14–9) || Wakefield (7–9) || || 22,240 || 77–68
|- style="text-align:center;background-color:#BBFFBB"
| 146 || September 14 || @ Orioles || 6–5 || Foulke (3–1) || López (9–16) || Timlin (5) || 27,741 || 78–68
|- style="text-align:center;background-color:#BBBBBB"
| – || September 15 || @ Yankees || colspan=5|Postponed (rain) || 78–68
|- style="text-align:center;background-color:#BBFFBB"
| 147 || September 16 || @ Yankees || 5–2 || Beckett (15–10) || Wang (17–6) || Timlin (6) || 55,091 || 79–68
|- style="text-align:center;background-color:#FFBBBB"
| 148 || September 16 || @ Yankees || 7–5 || Proctor (6–4) || Breslow (0–2) || Farnsworth (5) || 55,167 || 79–69
|- style="text-align:center;background-color:#BBFFBB"
| 149 || September 17 || @ Yankees || 6–3 || Corey (2–1) || Villone (3–3) || Timlin (7) || 55,002 || 80–69
|- style="text-align:center;background-color:#BBFFBB"
| 150 || September 17 || @ Yankees || 5–4 || López (1–0) || Farnsworth (3–5) || Timlin (8) || 55,221 || 81–69
|- style="text-align:center;background-color:#FFBBBB"
| 151 || September 19 || Twins || 7–3 || Garza (2–5) || Wakefield (7–10) || || 36,242 || 81–70
|- style="text-align:center;background-color:#FFBBBB"
| 152 || September 20 || Twins || 8–2 || Bonser (6–5) || Hansen (2–2) || || 36,484 || 81–71
|- style="text-align:center;background-color:#BBFFBB"
| 153 || September 21 || Twins || 6–0 || Beckett (16–10) || Santana (18–6) || || 36,434 || 82–71
|- style="text-align:center;background-color:#BBFFBB"
| 154 || September 22 || @ Blue Jays || 7–1 || Tavárez (4–4) || Lilly (14–13) || || 33,874 || 83–71
|- style="text-align:center;background-color:#FFBBBB"
| 155 || September 23 || @ Blue Jays || 5–3 || Burnett (9–8) || Hansack (0–1) || Ryan (35) || 42,267 || 83–72
|- style="text-align:center;background-color:#FFBBBB"
| 156 || September 24 || @ Blue Jays || 13–4 || Chacín (9–3) || Snyder (4–5) || || 44,212 || 83–73
|- style="text-align:center;background-color:#FFBBBB"
| 157 || September 25 || @ Blue Jays || 5–0 || Marcum (3–4) || Wakefield (7–11) || || 40,123 || 83–74
|- style="text-align:center;background-color:#BBFFBB"
| 158 || September 26 || Devil Rays || 5–1 || Schilling (15–7) || Hammel (0–5) || || 36,134 || 84–74
|- style="text-align:center;background-color:#FFBBBB"
| 159 || September 27 || Devil Rays || 11–0 || Corcoran (5–9) || Beckett (16–11) || || 36,028 || 84–75
|- style="text-align:center;background-color:#BBFFBB"
| 160 || September 29 || Orioles || 4–3 || Tavárez (5–4) || Bédard (15–11) || Timlin (9) || 36,269 || 85–75
|- style="text-align:center;background-color:#FFBBBB"
| 161 || September 30 || Orioles || 5–4 || Ray (4–4) || Timlin (6–6) || || 36,596 || 85–76

|- style="text-align:center;background-color:#BBFFBB"
| 162 || October 1 || Orioles || 9–0 || Hansack (4–4) || Penn (6–6) || || 35,826 || 86–76

Player stats

Batting
Note: G = Games played; AB = At bats; R = Runs; H = Hits; 2B = Doubles; 3B = Triples; HR = Home runs; RBI = Runs batted in; BB = Bases on balls; SO = Strikeouts; Avg. = Batting average; SB = Stolen bases

 Bold indicates leader in category.

Pitching
 Bold indicates leader in category.

Starting pitchers
Note: G = Games pitched; IP = Innings pitched; W = Wins; L = Losses; ERA = Earned run average; SO = Strikeouts

Other pitchers
Note: G = Games pitched; IP = Innings pitched; W = Wins; L = Losses; ERA = Earned run average; SO = Strikeouts

Relief pitchers
Note: G = Games pitched; W = Wins; L = Losses; SV = Saves; ERA = Earned run average; SO = Strikeouts

Awards and honors
 Mark Loretta – Hutch Award
 David Ortiz – Silver Slugger Award (DH), AL Player of the Month (July)
 Jonathan Papelbon – AL Rookie of the Month (April)
 Manny Ramirez – Silver Slugger Award (OF)

All-Star Game
 Mark Loretta, starting 2B
 David Ortiz, starting 1B
 Jonathan Papelbon, reserve P
 Manny Ramírez, starting OF (did not attend)

Farm system

The Class A Greenville Drive had previously been nicknamed the Bombers.

LEAGUE CHAMPIONS: Portland, GCL Red Sox

Source:

References

External links

Game Logs:
1st Half: Boston Red Sox Game Log on ESPN.com
2nd Half: Boston Red Sox Game Log on ESPN.com
Batting Statistics: Boston Red Sox Batting Stats on ESPN.com
Pitching Statistics: Boston Red Sox Pitching Stats on ESPN.com
2006 Boston Red Sox season at Baseball Reference
2006 Boston Red Sox Draft Selections 

Boston Red Sox seasons
Boston Red Sox
Boston Red Sox
Red Sox